Ken's Foods is a privately held food manufacturing company located in Marlborough, Massachusetts. Ken's primary products are salad dressings, sauces, and marinades. The company's commercial food manufacturing divisions produce products both for retail sale and food service, including contract manufacturing for companies such as Newman's Own.

Operations 
Ken's is the number-three manufacturer of salad dressings in the United States behind Kraft Foods and Wish-Bone. Besides its headquarters in Marlborough, the company employs over 600 people in facilities located in McDonough, Georgia, and Las Vegas, Nevada. The company's commercial foods division provides the majority of business, generating about $100 million in sales during 2001. Its retail sales of the company's bottled products reached almost $88 million in 2002.

History 
The brand takes its name after Ken's Steak House, a Framingham, Massachusetts, restaurant founded by Ken and Florence Hanna in 1941. As the restaurant grew, locals began to request that the Hannas bottle their dressings for sale. In 1958 the Hannas licensed the company's name to a family friend and the manufacturing company was then founded.

In 2005, they bought the Sweet Baby Ray's BBQ sauce company for $30 million.

References

External links 
 Ken's Food Website

Salad dressings
Condiment companies of the United States
Steakhouses in the United States